Rabban Mar Hormizd was a monk who lived in the seventh century in modern northern Iraq. Rabban is the Syriac term for monk.  "Rabban" is also the Aramaic word for "teacher". He founded the Rabban Hormizd Monastery in Alqosh, named after him, which has served in the past as the patriarchate of the Church of the East.

In the Church of the East and its descendant branches, Rabban Hormizd is commemorated on the second Sunday after Easter.

Life
According to The histories of Rabban Hormizd the Persian and Rabban Bar-Idta, a text written by his disciple Simon before the 12th century, Hormizd was born at the end of the sixth or beginning the seventh century at Beth Lapat (in Sassanid ruled Assyria) from a rich or noble family, and at the age of eighteen he started to travel towards Scetes to become a monk there. On the way he met three monks of the Church of the East monastery of Bar Idta who urged him to become an inmate of their monastery, and he did so. He lived a hard, stern life. Hormizd lived in and near the Monastery of Bar Idta for thirty-nine years and in the monastery of Abba Abraham of Risha for six or seven years.

When Hormizd was sixty-five or sixty-six, he left the monastery and passing out of the 
country of Marga went and settled down in the mountain of Beth 'Edhrai near the Assyrian town of Alqosh. When he had been there some little time the people in the neighbourhood offered to build him a monastery, the present Rabban Hormizd Monastery. The following part of the life of Rabban Hormizd is marked by episodes in which the saint opposed the miaphysite monks of the Mar Mattai Monastery.

Gallery

Notes

External links
Memorial of Rabban Hormizd - Kaldaya.net
E. A. Wallis Budge, The histories of rabban Hôrmîzd the Persian and rabban Bar-ʻIdtâ, I, The syriac textes, London 1902
E. A. Wallis Budge, The histories of rabban Hôrmîzd the Persian and rabban Bar-ʻIdtâ, II/1, English translations, London 1902
E. A. Wallis Budge, The histories of rabban Hôrmîzd the Persian and rabban Bar-ʻIdtâ, II/2, The metrical life of rabban Hôrmîzd by Mâr Sergius of Âdhôrbâîjân. English translations, London 1902

Assyrian Church of the East saints
Persian saints
Eastern Catholic saints
7th-century Christian saints
7th-century Christian monks
7th-century Iranian people
Christians in the Sasanian Empire
People from Khuzestan Province